Jean-Robens Jerome (born July 23, 1983) is a Haitian soccer player whose last known club was Olimpia Bălţi in the Moldovan National Division.

Career
Jerome has spent much of his professional career bouncing between the United States and Moldova; he has had three stints playing for the Pittsburgh Riverhounds in the USL Second Division, making 31 appearances and scoring 5 goals during his tenure there.

Jerome has also played for Tiligul-Tiras Tiraspol in the Moldovan National Division, and returned to Moldova in 2009 to play for Olimpia Bălţi.

International
Jerome made his debut for the Haiti national football team in 2009, scored his first international goal on May 25, 2009 in a 1–1 tie with Jamaica, and was part of the Haiti squad at the 2009 CONCACAF Gold Cup.

References

External links

1983 births
Living people
Association football forwards
Haitian footballers
People from Ouest (department)
Haiti international footballers
2009 CONCACAF Gold Cup players
USL Second Division players
Pittsburgh Riverhounds SC players
CSF Bălți players
Haitian expatriate footballers
Haitian expatriate sportspeople in the United States
Expatriate soccer players in the United States
Haitian expatriate sportspeople in Moldova
Expatriate footballers in Moldova